Alberto Canapino (23 May 1963 – 15 February 2021) was an Argentine racing car preparer, recognized for his activity at the national level in the different series of motorsport in his country.

Biography
He was recognized in the field of Argentine motor sport, thanks to the achievements obtained by drivers who competed on cars that had his preparation, both in Turismo Carretera, and in other series. 

On 3 February 2021, Canapino was admitted to a Buenos Aires clinic with COVID-19 symptoms during the COVID-19 pandemic in Argentina, which worsened and caused his death on 15 February. He is the father of Agustín Canapino, current Indycar Series driver and multiple Turismo Carretera champion among other categories, and Matías, TC Pista driver.

Titles achieved as an preparer

References

External links 
 Trajectory of Alberto Canapino
 Personal file of Alberto Canpino

1963 births
2021 deaths
Argentine automobile designers
Auto racing crew chiefs
People from Arrecifes
Deaths from the COVID-19 pandemic in Argentina
Motorsport team owners